The Hero World Challenge is a golf tournament hosted by Tiger Woods, which takes place each December. It features a small number (currently 20) of top-ranked golf pros. The tournament is a benefit for the Tiger Woods Foundation. The event is part of the PGA Tour schedule, but does not offer FedEx Cup points or official money as it is an unofficial event.

Format
Initially, the tournament had a 16-man field composed of the defending champion, the top 11 available players from the Official World Golf Ranking, and four sponsors exemptions chosen by the Tiger Woods Foundation. In 2008, the field was increased to 18 players, consisting of the most recent winners of the four major PGA tournaments, the top 11 available players from the Official World Golf Ranking, the defending champion, and two special exemption players selected by the foundation.

Prize money won by the players is not included in money rankings on any of the world's professional golf tours, but the tournament is recognized as an unofficial money event by the PGA Tour. Since 2009, the event offers Official World Golf Ranking points.

In 2007 the total prize fund was $5.75 million, similar to many official PGA Tour events, which usually have fields of about 150 players. In 2014, the first prize was $1 million, and the total purse was $3.5 million. Woods usually donates his prize money to his foundation.

Hero World Challenge tournament is preceded by a pro-am competition, in which professional golfers play with amateurs. Hero World Challenge pro-am is usually organized two days before the first round of professional play. "Am-Am outing" takes place on the first day, "Official Pro-Am" on the second day. The access to the pro-am competition is limited only to the tournament partners. The pro-am tournament is closed to public.

The amateur participants of the 2016 pro-am included, for instance, Derek Jeter and Tino Martinez.

History
In 2000, the tournament was staged twice, with Tom Lehman winning the first event in January. The tournament then moved to December of that year, with Davis Love III winning that event. It has been played in December ever since. The January 2000 event was played at Grayhawk Golf Club in Scottsdale, Arizona. From December 2000 to 2013, the event took place at Sherwood Country Club, a course designed by Jack Nicklaus, in Thousand Oaks, California.

In 2008, Woods did not compete due to knee surgery following his 2008 U.S. Open victory, even though he was the two-time defending champion. He did not play in 2009 due to time spent away from golf related to personal matters. Woods returned to the event in 2010.

In 2011, Woods won the tournament with a score of −10, defeating Zach Johnson by one shot. Woods made birdie on the final two holes to win; it was his first win in over two years, since the 2009 Australian Masters.

It was called the Chevron World Challenge from 2008 through 2011. It previously went by the names Williams World Challenge and Target World Challenge. In 2012, new sponsor Northwestern Mutual was the presenting sponsor instead of a title sponsor. They became the title sponsor in 2013. In 2014, Hero MotoCorp became the title sponsor.

In 2015, the event moved to the Albany development in the Bahamas.

Television
The first World Challenge was televised by the USA Network and NBC Sports. It was then covered by USA and ABC Sports from 2000 to 2006. It has been televised by Golf Channel and a returning NBC since 2007.

Winners

References

External links

Coverage on the PGA Tour's official site

PGA Tour unofficial money events
Golf in Arizona
Golf in California
Golf in Florida
Golf tournaments in the Bahamas
Sports competitions in Scottsdale, Arizona
Sports in Ventura County, California
Sports in Thousand Oaks, California
Tiger Woods
Recurring sporting events established in 1999
1999 establishments in Arizona
Hero Group